Arthur Whittam was an English professional footballer who played as a centre forward.

References

English footballers
Association football forwards
Burnley F.C. players
English Football League players
Year of death missing
Year of birth missing